The Butler Armory is an historic National Guard armory which is located on Washington Street in Butler, Butler County, Pennsylvania. 

It was listed on the National Register of Historic Places in 1991.

History and architectural features
Designed by architect Joseph F. Kuntz with W.G. Wilkins, Co. and built in 1922, it was expanded in 1930. It is a "T"-plan building that consists of a one-story, brick, drill hall fronted by a two-story, brick administration section. The front section was designed in the Art Deco style. The building sits on a stone foundation. The administration section has a flat roof and the drill hall has a gambrel roof.

It was listed on the National Register of Historic Places in 1991.

On June 23, 2010 Brig. Gen. Joseph De Paul dedicated the new Butler Readiness Center. The new facility, located at 250 Kriess Road, Renfrew, Pennsylvania, is home to Company A, 1st Battalion, 112th Infantry Regiment, 56th Stryker Brigade Combat Team. In addition to providing additional space for soldiers to work and train, it allows the soldiers of the Stryker Brigade to conduct the technical training required for the advanced systems they use during combat operations.

References

Armories on the National Register of Historic Places in Pennsylvania
Art Deco architecture in Pennsylvania
Infrastructure completed in 1930
Buildings and structures in Butler County, Pennsylvania
Butler, Pennsylvania
National Register of Historic Places in Butler County, Pennsylvania